Maliarpha is a genus of moths of the family Pyralidae.

Species
Maliarpha brunnella  Cook, 1997
Maliarpha concinnella  (Ragonot, 1888)
Maliarpha fuscicostella  Cook, 1997
Maliarpha longisignumella  Cook, 1997
Maliarpha rosella  Hampson, 1896
Maliarpha separatella  Ragonot, 1888
Maliarpha validella  Zerny in Rebel & Zerny, 1917

References

Anerastiini
Pyralidae genera